"My Shit" (also known as "My Shhh" or "My S***" on the clean versions) is a song by American rapper A Boogie wit da Hoodie, taken from his first full-length project, a mixtape titled Artist. The song was released as a single via digital distribution on July 1, 2016. The song peaked at number 86 on the Billboard Hot 100. The song was used in the Rick and Morty episode "The Old Man and The Seat".

Chart performance
The single debuted at number 98 on the US Billboard Hot 100 chart on the week of November 5, 2016. It eventually peaked at number 86 twelve weeks later. The song was certified 2× Platinum by the Recording Industry Association of America (RIAA) for combined sales and streaming equivalent units of over 2 million units in the United States.

Charts

Certifications

References

2016 singles
2016 songs
A Boogie wit da Hoodie songs
Songs written by A Boogie wit da Hoodie

Atlantic Records singles